Mush, MUSH, or Mushing may refer to :

Common meanings 
 Mush (cornmeal), a kind of corn pudding or porridge
 Mushing, a sport or transport method powered by dogs or a command to a dog team
 Psilocybin mushroom, a mushroom used as a recreational drug

Places and jurisdictions 
 Muş Province, in eastern Anatolia (Asian Turkey)
 Muş, a town and the capital of Muş Province, transliterated as "Mush", former bishopric and present Armenian Catholic titular see

People

Nickname 
 Mushtaq Ahmed (cricketer, born 1970), Pakistani former cricketer
 Mushaga Bakenga (born 1992), Norwegian footballer of Congolese descent
 Mush Crawford (1898-1966), American National Football League player
 R. V. Kerr (1891-1960), American collegiate football player and educator
 Mush March (1908-2002), Canadian National Hockey League player
 Dudley W. Morton (1907-1943), US Navy World War II submarine commander
 Pervez Musharraf (born 1943), former president of Pakistan sometimes referred to as "Mush"
 William Riley (criminal) (fl. 1870–1878), American businessman, saloon keeper and underworld figure in Manhattan, New York

Surname 
 John Mush (1551/52-1612/13), English Roman Catholic priest

Music 
 Mush (album), a 1991 album by the band Leatherface
 Mush Records, a Los Angeles-based independent record label

Internet and technology 
 MUSH, a type of text-based online social medium (often called a "Multi-User Shared Hallucination")
 Mush (computer game), a browser game from Motion Twin
 MUSH (e-mail client), the Mail User's Shell, a Unix Shell-like mail user-agent

Other uses 
 Kneading (cats) (also called "mushing"), a behavior of domestic cats when they are content or are preparing to settle for a nap

Lists of people by nickname